Pol Lozano Vizuete (born 6 October 1999) is a Spanish professional footballer who plays as a central midfielder for Granada CF, on loan from RCD Espanyol.

Club career
Born in Sant Quirze del Vallès, Barcelona, Catalonia, Lozano joined RCD Espanyol's youth setup in 2006, from CE Mercantil. He made his senior debut with the reserves on 14 May 2017, starting in a 2–3 Segunda División B away loss against CE Sabadell, as his side was already relegated.

Lozano scored his first senior goal on 15 October 2017, netting his team's second in a 2–2 home draw against Terrassa FC. The following 4 July, after achieving promotion, he renewed his contract until 2023, being definitely promoted to the main squad for the 2019–20 campaign.

Lozano made his professional debut on 15 August 2019, coming on as a second-half substitute for Sergi Darder in a 3–0 home defeat of FC Luzern, for the season's UEFA Europa League. He made his La Liga debut on 7 December, playing the last 18 minutes in a 0–2 loss at Real Madrid.

On 30 August 2021, Lozano was loaned to Segunda División side Girona FC, for one year. He scored his first professional goal four days later, netting his team's only in a 2–1 home loss against Sporting de Gijón.

After starting the 2022–23 season at Espanyol, on 30 January 2023 Lozano joined second division club Granada CF on loan until the end of the season.

Honours

International 
Spain U17
UEFA European Under-17 Championship runner-up: 2016

References

External links

1999 births
Living people
People from Vallès Occidental
Sportspeople from the Province of Barcelona
Spanish footballers
Footballers from Catalonia
Association football midfielders
La Liga players
Segunda División players
Segunda División B players
Tercera División players
RCD Espanyol B footballers
RCD Espanyol footballers
Girona FC players
Granada CF footballers
Spain youth international footballers
Spain under-21 international footballers